Fethard St Mogues GAA Club is a Gaelic Athletic Association club located in Fethard-on-Sea, County Wexford, Ireland. They are a dual Senior club. It plays in the Wexford GAA club championships, fielding teams in hurling (at Senior and Junior B) and Gaelic football (at Senior and Junior B).

Fethard GAA Club was founded in 1889 and was known as "The Hook". This name was changed to Erin Hope in the early 1900s. The first colours worn by the club was canary yellow and green. The club won its first county Junior B football title in 1917 and was then known as Fethard. Jim Byrne, who won 6 Leinster and 4 All Ireland senior football medals, was teaching in Poulfur at that time and was instrumental in getting that team together. Immigration in the 1930s and 1940s saw the club sink into virtual non-existence. In an effort to rejuvenate the club at this time the name was changed to its present name St Mogue in honour of the saint to whom the parish is dedicated.

During the 1950s the club entered 7 a side competitions but no adult teams were fielded in local championships between 1959 and 1962. Hard work by Mikie Barden and Tom Hickey at underage level helped establish the club again in the early 1970s with hurling teams now being fielded. Famous stories of Fethard versus Saltmills being played in Gurtins with many ending up in the doctors afterwards are legendary!

The big breakthrough came in 1980 when the club won its first adult county title in the modern era when the junior B hurlers were victorious followed by the junior A footballers in 1984. John Hehir and Joe Foley were now training teams to county titles at underage level and this paid off with the great success at adult level of the 1990s winning junior A hurling 1992, intermediate football 93 and intermediate hurling 94. The club now fielded senior teams in both hurling and football and the football team reached the ultimate goal in winning the senior championship in 1998. They once again reached the Senior football final in 2013, however St. Martin's GAA were victorious in this match up. In 2017, the Intermediate A hurling team won the county championship and entered the Leinster Junior Club Hurling Championship for the first time in its history. They defeated John Locke's in the final to mark an historic first for the club. The progressed to the All Ireland final after defeating Brother Pearses in London in the quarter final and Sylane of Galway in the semi final. The All Ireland Junior final was played in Croke Park on Sunday 4 February 2018, but Fethard were defeated after Extra Time by Ardmore of Waterford. 

Despite this defeat, the club went into the season back in the Intermediate grade for the first time in seven years in good form. They qualified for the county final to face Cloughbawn who had just been relegated from Senior the year previous. The county final was an exciting and very well played game, finishing out a draw.  The replay the following week was equally as tense, with no room for error, but Fethard won through to get back to the Senior hurling grade for the first time since 2001.  Their Intermediate Leinster campaign began with a fine win over strongly fancied Kiltale of Meath, but were defeated by a very strong Graigue Ballycallan side in the Leinster Semi Final.

In 2021, both the hurling and football teams were relegated from Senior to Intermediate, however they bounced back in 2022 with an impressive football championship campaign, culminating in an exciting final win over neighbours Horeswood. this lead them onto participation in the Leinster Club Intermediate Football competition, where they advanced through to the final beating The Heath of Laois, Greystones of Wicklow and Mullinavat of Kilkenny. A pulsating final in Wexford Park against Dunshaughlin of Meath saw Fethard victorious to claim a historic win, as the first Wexford club to win both Hurling and Football Leinster titles.

The club has played in a number of pitches down through the years but in the centenary year of 1989, under the chairmanship of Peter O’Loughlin, a decision was made to purchase a suitable pitch. A 13-acre site was purchased from Tom Hickey in Ramstown and this was developed into two pitches plus dressing rooms and handball alley. Major fundraising was undertaken and this included an initiative run in conjunction with the local Church of Ireland of the same name. Further development work has been carried out since including draining the main pitch in 2003 and the installation of a state of the art floodlighting system in 2005, hurling wall 2008, viewing stand in 2009 and most recently, an astro pitch has been installed.

Honours

Adult Football 
 Leinster Intermediate Club Football Championship - 2022
 Wexford Senior Football Championship - 1998
 Wexford Intermediate Football Championship - 1993, 2022 
 Wexford Junior A Football Championship - 1984
 Wexford Junior B Football Championship: - 1917 & 2000

Adult Hurling 
 Leinster Junior Club Hurling Championship - 2017
 Wexford Intermediate Hurling Championship - 1994, 2018
 Wexford Intermediate A Hurling Championship: - 2017
 Wexford Junior A Hurling Championship: - 1992
 Wexford Junior B Hurling Championship: - 1980 & 1996
 All-Ireland Junior 7's Hurling - 1994

Underage 
 U-21 Football
 Minor Football x5
 U-16 Football
 U-16 Hurling
 U-14 Football x 2
 U-14 Feile All Ireland Hurling x 1
 U-14 Feile All Ireland Football x 1
 U-13 Rackard League Football x 4
 U-13 Rackard League Hurling
 U-12 Football x 3
 U-10 De Roste Shield Football x 3
 U-10 Caulfield Cup Hurling

References

Other Sources

Gaelic games clubs in County Wexford
Hurling clubs in County Wexford
Gaelic football clubs in County Wexford